Janet Jacobs  (born October 31, 1928) is a former shortstop and center fielder who played in the All-American Girls Professional Baseball League during its 1945 season. Listed at 5' 4", 120 lb., Jacobs was a switch hitter who threw right handed. She was dubbed Jay Jay by her teammates.

Born in Englewood, New Jersey, Jacobs attended Dwight Morrow High School. She played on the school's varsity baseball team but was forced to quit after a few games after being told by the principal that it was not the way a young lady should act.

Jacobs spent a season with the Racine Belles club before going on to college. She posted a batting average of .170 (17-for-100) in 38 game appearances, driving in seven runs and scoring six times, while hitting two homers with eight stolen bases.

Afterwards, Jacobs switched to swimming and earned a bachelor's degree in chemistry from the Purdue University in West Lafayette, Indiana. She then married and raised a family of four children.

In her spare time, Janet played tennis and competed in the Senior Platform Tennis Championships in the 1980s. She later moved to Franklin Lakes, New Jersey.

The All-American Girls Professional Baseball League folded in 1954, but there is now a permanent display at the Baseball Hall of Fame and Museum at Cooperstown, New York since November 5, 1988 that honors those who were part of this unique experience. Janet, along with the rest of the girls and the league staff, is included at the display/exhibit.

Sources

1928 births
Living people
All-American Girls Professional Baseball League players
Racine Belles (1943–1950) players
Baseball players from New Jersey
Dwight Morrow High School alumni
People from Englewood, New Jersey
People from Franklin Lakes, New Jersey
Purdue University alumni
Sportspeople from Bergen County, New Jersey
21st-century American women